Libeaus Desconus is a 14th-century Middle English version of the popular "Fair Unknown" story. Its author is thought to be Thomas Chestre. The story matter displays strong parallels to that of Renaut de Beaujeu's Le Bel Inconnu; both versions describe the adventures of Gingalain, the son of King Arthur's knight Gawain and a fay who raises him ignorant of his parentage and his name. As a young man, he visits Arthur's court to be knighted, and receives his nickname; in this case Sir Libeaus Desconus, before setting forth on a series of adventures which consolidate his new position in society. He eventually discovers who is his father, and marries a powerful lady.

Other versions of the story include the Middle High German romance Wigalois (1204–1209) by Wirnt von Gravenberc. The "Fair Unknown" story has parallels in the tale of La Cote Male Taile, Chrétien de Troyes' Conte du Graal, Sir Thomas Malory's Tale of Sir Gareth from Le Morte d'Arthur, and the 14th-century Italian epic Carduino.

Manuscripts
Versions of Libeaus Desconus can be found in the following manuscripts:
 British Library MS Cotton Caligula A. ii, mid-fifteenth century;
 Lambeth Palace MS 306, mid-fifteenth century;
 Lincoln's Inn MS Hale 150, late-fourteenth/early-fifteenth century;
 Bodleian Library MS Ashmole 61, late-fifteenth century;
 Biblioteca Nazionale, Naples, MS XIII B. 29, mid-fifteenth century;
 British Library Additional MS 27879 (also known as MS Percy), seventeenth century.

Judged by the number of surviving manuscripts, the Libeaus Desconus was the most popular of the Arthurian romances in Middle English.

Plot
(This summary is based on the Lambeth Palace text.)

Gyngelayne is raised in the forest by his mother, who tries to keep him away from arms since she fears that her 'wild' son might otherwise come to harm. Gyngelayne is never told his real name by his mother. Instead, she calls him ‘Bewfiȝ’, since he is 'gentle of body' and has an attractive face. One day, Gyngelayne finds a dead knight in the forest. He dons the man's armour and goes to Glastonbury, where King Arthur is holding court. There he asks Arthur to dub him a knight although his upbringing is uncourtly. Arthur is so pleased by young Gyngelayne's sight that he gives him a name – Libeaus Desconus, ‘The Fair Unknown’ – and knights him that same day. Libeaus at once asks King Arthur if he might be offered the first challenge for which the king is required to provide a champion.

Soon a fair maiden, Ellyne, and a dwarf, Theodeley, come riding in. They have been sent by the lady of Synadowne, who has been imprisoned. Cannot Arthur send a knight to free her mistress? When Arthur grants the youthful Libeaus the quest, the maiden is angered, yet the king refuses to replace Libeaus with another knight.

Libeaus, Ellyne, and the dwarf set off on their journey, in acrimony. On the third day, Libeaus defeats a knight called Syr William Delaraunche, who had never yet been overcome in combat. Only now does Ellyne's ridicule of Lybeaus subside. Libeaus sends 'Syr William' to Arthur's court, where he is to tell the king who defeated him. Next morning, Libeaus is attacked by William's three cousins. He breaks one's thigh, another's arm and forces them all to go to Arthur's court, where they are to tell the king by whom they were defeated, and subject themselves to him.

In a wild forest, Libeaus saves a maiden from two giants and sends their heads to King Arthur. The maiden's father, an earl, offers Libeaus his daughter's hand in marriage, but Libeaus declines because he has a mission to accomplish. He is then given beautiful armour and a fine steed and he, the maiden Ellyne and the dwarf continue on their journey. Libeaus next defeats the Lord of Cardiff, winning a gyrfalcon, a scene that bears striking similarities with an episode in Chrétien de Troyes' twelfth century romance Erec and Enide, retold in the Welsh Mabinogion tale Gereint and Enid. He has the prize taken to Arthur, who is so satisfied with his knight that he decides to send him a hundred pounds. Libeaus uses the gold to hold a forty-days feast, and then moves on with his companions.

In a forest, Libeaus catches a many-coloured hunting dog at Ellyne's request. A man called Sir Otis claims that it is his, but Libeaus refuses to give it up. He soon finds himself faced by a full-fledged army, which he defeats single-handedly. Sir Otis, too, is sent to Arthur's court. And after many adventures in Ireland and Wales, Libeaus arrives at the beautiful Isle of Gold ('Jl de Ore'), a city of castles and palaces. Its lady is besieged by a Saracen giant called Maugys. After a long and eventful fight, Libeaus is able to kill the giant. La Dame Amour, Lady of the Island, offers the hero her love, and lordship over the Jl de Ore. Libeaus gladly accepts, and for twelve months he lives a life of 'recreauntise'. When one day Libeaus meets the maiden Ellyne, she points out to Libeaus that he has been disloyal to his lord in abandoning his quest. He feels deeply ashamed and leaves the Jl de Ore. With him he takes his horse, his armour and Jurflete, La Dame Amour's steward, whom he makes his squire. They travel onwards, he, Ellyne and his new squire, towards Synadowne.

Arriving at Synadowne at last, Libeaus defeats Lanwarde, the city's steward, who has the habit of fighting every knight who comes to the city looking for a place to stay. Libeaus asks who the knight is who is holding the Lady of Synadowne prisoner. Lanwarde informs Libeaus that the Lady of Synadowne is being held captive not by any knight but by two clerics who practice black magic (‘nigermansye’):
"Quod Lambert, 'Be Seint John!
Knyght, sir, is ther none
That durste hir away lede.
Twoo clerkys ben hir foone,
Fekyll off bloode and bone,
That hauyth y-doo this dede."

Lanwarde informs Libeaus that these two clerics, called Jrayne and Mabon, have created a 'paleys', an edifice which no nobleman dares enter, and they say that they will kill the lady unless she transfers all of her power to Mabon.

Next morning, Libeaus enters this palace and, leading his horse by the reins, finds nobody there but minstrels playing their music. Going deeper into the palace, searching for someone to fight with, he passes magnificent columns and stained glass windows and sits down on the raised platform at the far end of the space. The minstrels who had been playing now vanish, the earth shakes, and stones fall down. On the field outside appear the two clerics, Mabon and Jrayne, armed and on horseback. They are intent on killing Libeaus, who does battle with them both, but Jrayne disappears before Libeaus can deal him the final blow: he was too busy slaying Mabon, 'the more shreweos'.

Depressed, Libeaus sits down in the palace hall: Jrayne might well cause him trouble in the future. While Libeaus contemplates his situation, a window appears in one of the walls, and a serpent with wings and a woman's face crawls through. It speaks, asserting that it is 'young', and then kisses a terrified Libeaus. Consequently, it changes into a beautiful young woman: the Lady of Synadowne. She thanks Libeaus for freeing her, and tells him that he has slain both of the evil clerks. She also tells him that the only way the curse which had changed her into a serpent could be lifted was by kissing Gawain or someone else of his kin. Then the lady offers herself and her many possessions to Libeaus, who gladly accepts.

After seven joyous days in Synadowne, Libeaus and the Lady of Synadowne go to King Arthur's court, where Arthur grants Libeaus the lady's hand. A forty-day feast follows, after which the newly-weds are escorted back to Synadowne by Arthur and his knights, where they live happily together for many years.

Style
Libeaus Desconus is a late fourteenth-century Middle English poem of around 2,200 lines (the exact number of lines varies amongst the six manuscripts). Like many Middle English romances (e.g. The Wedding of Sir Gawain and Dame Ragnelle and Emaré) the poem is divided into stanzas of tail-rhyme verse, a rhyming couplet followed by a tail-rhyme, repeated four times in each stanza in a scheme like AABCCBDDBEEB.

Writing principally in a dialect of southern England, possibly the SE Midlands, Thomas Chestre has been described as a "hack writer" who had an acquaintance with a number of other Middle English romances and was able to borrow from them, often retaining the different dialects of the bits and pieces he incorporated into his own poetry. Libeaus Desconus was written for a more popular audience than the Old French romances on which it models itself.

Thomas Chestre's sources
Most of the themes and motifs in Libeaus Desconus are drawn from a common stock of medieval Arthurian material. It is difficult to assign a unique work from which this Middle English poem derives, although some have argued for a lost twelfth century romance from which both Libeaus Desconus and the much earlier, late twelfth or early thirteenth-century Old French Le Bel Inconnu have their source. Le Bel Inconnu may have been known to the author in a manuscript copy that was not identical to the only copy which now survives, and Thomas Chestre may have had access to this "as well as other, related, material".
 
There are Old French, Middle High German and Italian versions of this tale, however, ranging in date from the late twelfth/early thirteenth century to the fifteenth century, and the similarities, links and differences between them seem too complex simply to assume a lost twelfth-century work from which they all originate; this despite a line in Libeaus Desconus that refers to a French source,"in Frensshe as it is j-ffounde", when describing a scene that differs from Le Bel Inconnu.

Themes and influences
As well as the late-twelfth/early thirteenth century Old French romance Le Bel Inconnu, or its hypothesised precursor, there are a number of other influences which may have contributed to Thomas Chestre's story Libeaus Desconus.

Perceval
The story of a young man who is brought up in the forest by his mother because she does not want him to learn about chivalry and fighting, and who later arrives at King Arthur's court in an innocent and dishevelled state with the desire to be made a knight, is none other than an account of the childhood of Perceval. Chrétien de Troyes introduced Perceval at the beginning of his unfinished last romance, Perceval, le Conte du Graal, written between 1180 and 1190, in which this young man, following his unlikely arrival at King Arthur's court, becomes embroiled in a search for a castle that, from the quills of other authors, evolved into a quest for the Holy Grail. There are indications that the author of Le Bel Inconnu knew not only Chrétien de Troyes' Perceval, le Conte du Graal but also the Second Continuation of this story, written some few years after Chretien de Troyes' death. Libeaus Desconus describes a succession of events immediately preceding the appearance of Mabon and Jrayne outside the palace in which Libeaus waits with his horse (sudden darkness, slamming of doors and windows, shower of stones, earthquake) that correspond very closely to one found in another adventure in Arthurian romance: the description in the Vulgate Lancelot of Sir Bors visit to the Grail Castle.

A Middle English verse romance, Sir Perceval of Galles (Sir Perceval of Wales), relates early events in the life of Perceval that are similar to those in Chrétien de Troyes' Perceval, le Conte du Graal, but then goes off at a tangent and omits any reference to the graal castle. "This omission has prompted the question of whether or not the tale's author knew Chrétien's version of the story". Sir Perceval of Galles may draw upon an earlier and more primitive version of the tale than Chrétien's, which would explain why it omits any reference to the graal castle or the graal, since these were inventions of Chrétien de Troyes. It has been suggested that the young man Libeaus Desconus "is only Perceval with a new name".

Welsh mythology
The collection of medieval Welsh stories known as the Mabinogion includes a short romance Peredur, considered to date from the late twelfth or early thirteenth century. This tale follows Chrétien's Perceval, le Conte du Graal for the most part (with deviations) and seems to know of the Graal continuation by Manessier Peredur may not simply be a working over of Chrétien's Perceval, however, but based upon an earlier version of the story, one from which both Chrétien de Troyes and the author of a lost twelfth-century romance – a romance upon which both Le Bel Inconnu and Libeaus Desconus may be based – each took as the basis for their respective works. The story of Peredur climaxes near the end of the tale with the slaying of a serpent. Many of the incidents in the story not following Chrétien's Conte du Graal are likely to represent a "Celtic tradition" and "confused or half-remembered stories about the hero".

Peredur may be the original name of Perceval, since Perceval in Old French is a meaningless "pierce-valley". Peredur seems similar to the Mabinogion character Pryderi in temperament and other evidence suggests as well that Pryderi may be the original of Peredur. Pryderi was born to the goddess Rhiannon, elsewhere in the Mabinogion, but snatched away by a monster and a dead puppy disguised to be his body. He returned again when the monster was killed and was brought up as Gwri Golden Hair, brought to his father's court, returned to Rhiannon and renamed Pryderi. Thus, like the mythological Ulster hero Cú Chulainn, Pryderi had two names and associations with a dog. It has been considered "well known that the stories of the youth of Cú Chulainn resemble those of the youth of Perceval". Peredur goes to one of the nine Hags of Gloucester to learn how to wield arms, just as Cú Chulainn went to the witch Skatha to learn how to fight.

Chrétien de Troyes' Erec and Enide
When Libeaus Desconus sends all the knights whom he defeats back to King Arthur's court, he is following the behaviour of Perceval in Chretien's adventure that leads him to the castle of the Fisher King.  And in Chrétien de Troyes' earlier romance Erec and Enide, retold in the Mabinogion tale of Geirant and Enid, following the episode where the hero fights a knight in a kind of beauty competition whose prize is a sparrow-hawk, Chretien's story, retold in the Mabinogion, describes a knight and a lady, who are not on speaking terms with one another, travelling through the countryside and encountering a succession of hostile knights whom the hero jousts with and kills. This story has itself been considered a successful reworking of material from which the tales of the Fair Unknown derive, in particular creating a heroine 'who is more complex and interesting than any of her counterparts in Le Bel Inconnu. There is evidence that Arthurian tales were often reworked, and that characters not originally associated with King Arthur in the eleventh and twelfth centuries were absorbed into his epic.

Hue de Rotelande's Ipomedon
The twelfth-century romance Ipomedon, written in Norman French by Hue de Rotelande, is found in a Middle English version, Ipomadon, in MS Chetham 8009, lying in Chetham's Library, Manchester, England and dating from "between the last decade of the fourteenth century and the middle of the fifteenth century". Following a number of adventures in which the eponymous hero demonstrates his martial prowess, Ipomadon puts on the garb of a fool and goes to the court of the uncle of the lady he loves, the King of Sicily, where he agrees to stay only if he is granted the "fyrste battayle". Shortly after he arrives, a maiden appears, "apon a palfreye white as mylke", seeking a champion to free her lady from oppression. The fool (Ipomadon) asks again that the quest be given to him. Since nobody else at court wants to undertake this task, the king concedes his request. The maiden is far from impressed. Only slowly does she moderate her acrimony as the fool travels along with her, defeating one hostile knight after another, until they reach the maiden's land and he frees the lady, who is, in fact, the lady he loves. The maiden's name is Imayne, she travels with a dwarf and, along the way, Ipomadon defeats a knight named Maugys.

Breton lays
The upbringing-in-the-wild motif is evident not only in tales of the Fair Unknown and in Chrétien de Troyes' Perceval, le Conte du Graal but in the Breton lay Tyolet. Known from only one Old French manuscript, dating to the late thirteenth or early fourteenth century, the lay itself was probably composed by the beginning of the thirteenth century. Like Perceval and Libeaus Desconus, Tyolet arrives at King Arthur's court as a young man who has spent all his childhood living alone in the forest with his mother. Like Perceval and Libeaus Desconus, what prompts Tyolet to go to King Arthur's court in the first place is the sight of armour. Unlike Chrétien's Perceval, but like Libeaus Desconus, an animal in this story is transformed into a human, in this case a stag which changes into an armed knight, a "knight-beast".

The Breton lays that we have from the twelfth and thirteenth centuries, on the evidence of the opening passages in Tyolet and others, describing their transmission, are possibly derived from stories that are considerably older, although the desire of medieval authors to "seek to ensure a measure of authenticity for their tales" should be remembered. Similarities in Tyolet and the Second Continuation of Chrétien's Perceval, le Conte du Graal has led R. H. Loomis to observe that the two stories "must derive from a common remote source".
 
Instances of animals transforming into human beings occur also in the twelfth-century Breton lays of Marie de France, in particular "Bisclavret" and "Yonec".

Irish mythology
The episode of the many-coloured hunting dogs and Libeaus's taking of one of them for Ellyne occurs also in Le Bel Inconnu and has parallels with  a Lay of the Great Fool, recorded by O'Daly in his Fenian poems, and well as a similar story in Campbell's Popular Tales of the West Highlands.
R. S. Loomis notes the similarities between the early life of Perceval and a twelfth-century text detailing the boyhood deeds of Fionn mac Cumhaill and makes a similar comparison with the boyhood of Sir Gawain's son Gingalais, who arrives at King Arthur's court to become the Fair Unknown. Fionn mac Cumhaill, for example, was a high-born son, first named Demne, deliberately reared deep in the forest, away from the threat of arms, spent his childhood hunting in this forest and at last came upon the home of a great lord where he was given the name Fionn, or Fair.

See also

Partonopeus de Blois
Amadís de Gaula

Notes

External links
 Translation of Libeaus Desconus into Modern English, by Jessie Weston
 Middle English editions of Lybeaus Desconus

14th-century books
14th-century poems
Arthurian literature in Middle English
Middle English literature
Medieval literature
Middle English poems